Euclid Avenue station may refer to:
 Euclid Avenue station (San Diego Trolley), a light rail station in San Diego
 Euclid Avenue station (IND Fulton Street Line), a subway station in Brooklyn, New York City
 Euclid Avenue station (Pennsylvania Railroad), a former railroad station in Cleveland